Gérard Dionne (19 June 1919 – 13 May 2020) was a Canadian Bishop of the Roman Catholic Church and the oldest Roman Catholic Bishop of Canada.

Biography
Dionne was born in Saint-Basile, New Brunswick and ordained a priest in Edmundston on 1 May 1948. He was appointed auxiliary bishop of the Diocese of Sault Sainte Marie, Ontario as well as Titular bishop of Garba on 29 January 1975 and consecrated on 8 April 1975. On 26 November 1983 he was appointed bishop of the Edmundston Diocese (installed on 29 January 1984) where he remained until his resignation on 20 October 1993.

In November 2009 a Canadian judge determined that Dionne thwarted a 1983 police investigation into child abuse allegations surrounding Father Bernard Cloutier. He turned 100 in June 2019.

References

External links
Catholic-Hierarchy
Edmundston diocese
Sault Sainte-Marie, Ontario Diocese
Canadian bishop thwarted police investigation of abusive priest

20th-century Roman Catholic bishops in Canada
Canadian centenarians
1919 births
2020 deaths
Men centenarians
People from Madawaska County, New Brunswick
Roman Catholic bishops of Sault Sainte Marie, Ontario
Roman Catholic bishops of Edmundston